KHSL may refer to:

 KHSL-FM, a radio station (103.5 FM) licensed to Paradise, California, United States
 KHSL-TV, a television station (channel 36, virtual 12) licensed to Chico, California, United States